The Drentsche Patrijshond is a versatile spaniel-type hunting dog from the Dutch province of Drenthe. Called the Dutch Partridge Dog (or "Drent" for Drenthe) in English, approximately 5,000 dogs are registered with the breed club in the Netherlands, and breed clubs operate in Belgium, Denmark, Scandinavia and North America. The Drentsche Patrijshond bears some resemblance to both spaniel and setter types of dog. An excellent pointer and retriever, this dog is often used to hunt fowl and adapts equally well to the field or marshes.

Appearance
Valid color is white with brown or orange markings. Mostly white with large brown plates (spots). There is usually one plate that covers the backside above the tail. A mantle (large marking across the back) is permissible, but generally less desired.  The coat is medium long, with feathers on the leg and longer hair on the front of the chest, giving the impression of a longer-haired coat. The Drentsche Patrijshond is 55 to 63 cm (22 to 25 in). at the withers. The breed weighs 48-73 pounds on average.

History

The origins of the Drentsche Patrijshond are in the 16th century, from the Spioenen (or Spanjoelen) which came to the Netherlands through France from Spain, and is related to the Small Münsterländer of Germany and the Epagneul Français of France. In the Netherlands, these dogs were called partridge dogs. 

The presence of the partridge dogs had been visible for centuries, as in the 17th-century painting The Hunter's Present, c. 1658–60, by Gabriel Metsu. In the painting, the partridge dog leans against the hunter's knee, as the man is handing a woman a partridge, which was a double entendre at the time. The dog in The Hunter's Present is a very large, stocky dog that could possibly pull a cart; showing the range of the early type, a much smaller, lighter dog of the same type is shown in another painting by the same artist, The Poultry seller, 1662. This painting also involves a woman being offered a bird, regarded with suspicion by her dog.

Before formal recognition as a modern breed in 1943, the type had been kept separate from other dogs as an undocumented breed for centuries in the rural province of Drenthe. As the Drentsche Patrijshond is a breed developed in the Netherlands, the breed standard was first developed and approved in 1943 by the Raad van Beheer op Kynologisch Gebied (Dutch Kennel Club), the Fédération Cynologique Internationale national kennel club for the Netherlands. The Fédération Cynologique Internationale recognised the breed using the standard developed by the breed's country of origin as the standard to be used in international competition. The United Kennel Club in the United States also recognises the breed using the outdated (February 1994) Fédération Cynologique Internationale standard. 

In November 2010, the AKC recognized the Drentsche Patrijshond Club of North America (DPCNA) and the Drentsche Patrijshond was added to the AKC Foundation Stock Service Program, allowing owners of registered Drents to participate in AKC sanctioned events such as hunt tests and agility competitions, starting in 2011.

Use 
The province of Drenthe 300 years ago was unusual, in that it allowed the common gentry the right to hunt. The local mayor, the farmer, and landowners in general developed dogs to support their pursuit of various small game.  Unlike many other hunting breeds, which were developed by, and for, the elite or nobility only to hunt, the Drentsche Patrijshond was expected to hunt all game, and also pull duty as watch dog, child playmate, etc.  Some were even used to pull the dog-carts of the day. For over 300 years, the Drentsche Patrijshond type has been an all-around dog.

Perfectly suited to the walk-up (upland) hunter, the Drent is thorough, in order to find all the game on the smaller plots available in Drenthe. It hunts with good speed, within reach of the gun. As with most European versatile breeds, the Drentsche Patrijshond points and retrieves, and will hunt both birds and small mammals, including rabbit, hare and fox. Today, the Drent is a favorite gun dog throughout its native country of the Netherlands, with approximately 5,000 dogs registered with the breed club.

Health 
Breed health concerns may include progressive retinal atrophy (PRA) and hereditary stomatocytosis.

Temperament 
Though the breed shows a strong hunting instinct in the field, and can be quite driven, these dogs tend to be more relaxed in the home than many of the hunting breeds. They are strongly attached to family members, loyal, and of sweet disposition, particularly with children.

Exercise 
Happiest when working alongside a hunter, the Drent enjoys the company of humans in the great outdoors. Several brisk turns around the park will satisfy it as well. Although it will come home and quietly assume its position on its bed, it should not be mistaken for a sedentary dog - the breed will suffer if insufficiently exercised.

See also
 Dogs portal
 List of dog breeds
 Schapendoes, another breed originating in Drenthe
 Rijksmuseum
 Common pheasant

References

External links

 The Dutch breed club for Drentsche Patrijshond
 Dutch breed club for Drentsche Patrijshond
 Drentsche Patrijshond Club of North America
 Belgian breed club for Drentsche Patrijshond
 Danish breed club for Drentsche Patrijshond
 Scandinavian countries Drentsche Patrijshond Club

Dog breeds originating in the Netherlands
FCI breeds
Rare dog breeds
Spaniels
Gundogs